Roseneath is a plantation with a historic mansion located at 5030 LA 5, about  southeast of Gloster, Louisiana, U.S.. According to family records, it was built in the 1846 for William Bundy Means, and has been occupied continuously by the Means family.

The mansion was listed on the National Register of Historic Places on January 13, 1989.

See also
National Register of Historic Places listings in DeSoto Parish, Louisiana

References

Houses on the National Register of Historic Places in Louisiana
Greek Revival architecture in Louisiana
Houses completed in 1846
Buildings and structures in DeSoto Parish, Louisiana
Plantations in Louisiana